"Will You" is a song by American Christian metal band P.O.D. and the lead single from their fifth studio album, Payable on Death. Released on September 22, 2003, the song charted at No. 17 on the Bubbling Under Hot 100 chart on December 2 that year.

Composition
The band chose "Will You" as a lead single to demonstrate a new side both lyrically and musically as noted by MTV's Jon Wiederhorn:
"The surging rhythm and audible tension are instantly familiar, as is the bottom-heavy groove laid down by bassist Traa and drummer Wuv, but the technical guitar fills and rap-free vocals of Sonny Sandoval give the band a new vibe."

"Will You" features lyrics of anxiety and desperation amidst a turbulent and potentially crumbling relationship. Sandoval explained the song's nature in an interview:
"We always said we wanted to do something like that, but it just kinda turned darker than your average 'I love you' type of song. It's about sticking with the one you love and putting up with that person and being there through thick and thin."

Music video
Shot in September 2003 in Los Angeles, the music video was directed by Marc Webb who also directed P.O.D.'s previous video. "Will You" carries the Christian message of turning the other cheek and deals with the problems faced by four adolescents with little in common. A young preppy girl is pressured into sex before being comforted by a punk rock girl; an interracial couple is harassed at a party; and a youth deals with an alcoholic mother. This is accompanied by sped-up footage of P.O.D. performing the song in a vacant lot.

Track listing
 "Will You (Album version)" - 3:48
 "Will You (Chris Vrenna remix)" - 3:54
 "Cain (Instrumental)" - 6:10

Official versions
 "Will You" 3:47
 "Will You (Video/Radio Edit)" 3:44
 "Will You (Chris Vrenna Remix)" 3:56
 "Will You (Tommie Sunshine New Mix)" 6:27
 "Will You (Tommie Sunshine Original Remix) "5:37
 "Will You (Tommie Sunshine Special Original Gigolo Instrumental)"  5:37
 "Will You (Tommie Sunshine Forever Remix)" 5:09

Charts

References

P.O.D. songs
2003 singles
Torch songs
Music videos directed by Marc Webb
2003 songs
2000s ballads
Song recordings produced by Howard Benson
Atlantic Records singles
Rock ballads
Songs written by Jason Truby
Songs written by Noah Bernardo
Songs written by Traa Daniels
Songs written by Sonny Sandoval